Brecknock, also known as the Howell's Mill Seat, is a historic home located near Camden, Kent County, Delaware.  The house is in four sections; two of brick and two frame. The original one-room house possibly dates before 1700 and is constructed of brick.  A brick section was added in the 1740s.  The -story, frame, main house was added in the mid-18th century and abuts the second brick section.  The final frame section was added in the 1880s and is a four-room apartment originally built for the wagon driver, but later incorporated into the house.

It was added to the National Register of Historic Places in 1974.

References

External links

Historic American Buildings Survey in Delaware
Houses on the National Register of Historic Places in Delaware
Houses completed in 1700
Houses in Kent County, Delaware
National Register of Historic Places in Kent County, Delaware
1700 establishments in Delaware